The Baths of Commodus (Latin: Thermae Comodianae) or Baths of Cleander (Latin: Thermae Cleandri) was a thermae (baths) complex in Rome, in Regio I Porta Capena, presumably to the south or south-east of the Baths of Caracalla. Although mentioned by several ancient authors no archaeological remains survive.

They were built by Marcus Aurelius Cleander, a favourite of the emperor Commodus and dedicated in 183, in the fourth year of Commodus' reign.
It included a gymnasium.

References

Bibliography 
 Samuel Ball Platner, A Topographical Dictionary of Ancient Rome, Oxford University Press, London, 1929 (completed and revised by Thomas Ashby), on: Bill Thayer's LacusCurtius.

External links 
 The Area of the Baths of Commodus - Historical Dioramas
  Scheda 243429, Census of Antique Works of Art and Architecture Known in the Renaissance, Berlin-Brandenburgische Akademie der Wissenschaften and Humboldt-Universität zu Berlin (last accessed 26-03-2014).

Commodus
Buildings and structures completed in the 2nd century